Fishguard and Goodwick railway station is a railway station sited 1 mile from Fishguard in the neighbouring town of Goodwick, Pembrokeshire, Wales. Following its closure in 1964 (1980 for Motorail), it reopened on 14 May 2012 following investment from Network Rail and Pembrokeshire County Council.

History

Construction of the line
The station was the planned terminus of the Rosebush and Fishguard Railway. Complications meant that, despite work having begun at Rosebush in 1878, the line was not completed by 1898 when the company (now called the North Pembrokeshire and Fishguard Railway) was purchased by the Great Western Railway Company. It is likely that this takeover was prompted by the North Pembrokeshire & Fishguard Railway's plans for a harbour at Goodwick to attract Irish traffic (the GWR had a major such port at Neyland) and/or their ambitious plan to link this new harbour to Carmarthen with their own line to break the GWR's monopoly of rail lines into west Wales.

Early years
Goodwick station opened on 1 August 1899 under GWR ownership. The station was called Goodwick until 1 May 1904 when it was renamed Fishguard and Goodwick. It was a terminus until the GWR opened their extension to Fishguard Harbour in 1906 and moved their Irish ferry operation there from Neyland.

Closure and subsequent usage
The station was closed on 6 April 1964 by British Railways, when local trains between Fishguard and Clarbeston Road were withdrawn. After closure to normal passenger trains the station remained in use for workmen's trains to the RNAD Trecwn, until these services were withdrawn on 1 August 1964.

From 18 June 1965 the station became the terminus of a seasonal motorail service from London, the end loading dock behind the former main (Up side) platform being used for unloading the cars. Early photographs show the station building to be shorter than it is today, with the extension carried out along with refurbishment for motorail traffic. Motorail kept the station in use each summer season until the regular service ended on 19 September 1980 and the occasional peak service on 16 September 1982.

The station was used temporarily in June 1982, when the railway lines at Fishguard Harbour were moved and re-laid. InterCity 125 services ran through the site of station until the early 1990s but services ceased in 1994.

Reopening

Reopening Fishguard and Goodwick as a rail/bus interchange had been considered by Pembrokeshire County Council for some years. For this reason it purchased the (disused) station site. This was sometime before an increased service frequency on the Fishguard line was secured, and no visible progress was made towards reopening until the announcement of extra trains. In March 2011, it was announced that Welsh Assembly Government subsidy would be provided to allow an increase in train frequency on the Fishguard line from two trains per day to seven from 12 September 2011 for three years. This prompted a search for funding to reopen Fishguard & Goodwick railway station; funding was successfully found and it was announced that the station was to reopen in March 2012.

The reopening work cost £325,000, including realignment of the track by Network Rail by the end of 2011 and laying of tarmac over part of the station yard to provide a car park (with further tarmac over the rest of the station yard, to enlarge the car park, a future possibility). Another aspect of the work was demolition and reconstruction of the station building, which took place in August 2011 between the announcement of extra services and their launch (on 12 September). Since the station is within the Goodwick Conservation Area, this demolition without approval of such plans would have violated policy 80 of the Joint Unitary Development Plan for Pembrokeshire, but went ahead anyway as the building was in a dangerous condition with very little in a state that could possibly have been salvaged.

The work to reopen the station was a joint operation between Pembrokeshire County Council and Network Rail. In March 2012, Network Rail announced that the station would reopen on 14 May 2012 and would be served by the seven trains each way per day which currently run through the station. The station duly reopened on 14 May 2012. It was adopted under Arriva's adopt-a-station scheme by the local community group POINT.

Services

2018
In the 2018 timetable, there were seven daily (Mon-Sat) departures each way on a very irregular schedule (particularly in the afternoon, where there were no departures either way for more than six hours). On Sundays, there were three trains each way, ran primarily to serve the ferry to/from Rosslare. Two of these ran to Swansea and the other to Cardiff Central.

2021
Due to the COVID-19 pandemic, services on the Fishguard branch have been reduced. As of August 2021, there are two daily departures from Mondays to Saturdays in each direction – one at midday, and one in the late evening. The two westbound services continue to Fishguard Harbour. The two eastbound services run to Carmarthen, with the midday service continuing to Cardiff Central.

On Sundays, there is an increased service of three trains per day in each direction. The additional mid-afternoon services run to Fishguard Harbour and Swansea.

References

External links

Joint Unitary Development Plan For Pembrokeshire
Fishguard and Goodwick Station on navigable 1954 O.S. map
Fishguard & Goodwick. The original station building photographed in-situ in 2006

Railway stations in Pembrokeshire
Former Great Western Railway stations
Railway stations served by Transport for Wales Rail
Railway stations in Great Britain opened in 1899
Railway stations in Great Britain closed in 1964
Railway stations in Great Britain opened in 1965
Railway stations in Great Britain closed in 1980
Railway stations in Great Britain opened in 2012
Reopened railway stations in Great Britain
Beeching closures in Wales
railway station